Rehmatullah (born 1 March 1998) is a Pakistani cricketer. He made his first-class debut for Federally Administered Tribal Areas in the 2017–18 Quaid-e-Azam Trophy on 2 November 2017.

References

External links
 

1998 births
Living people
Pakistani cricketers
Place of birth missing (living people)
Federally Administered Tribal Areas cricketers